"Circle the Drain" (stylized  in all lowercase) is a song recorded by American singer-songwriter Soccer Mommy. The song was released on January 14, 2020 through Loma Vista Recordings, as the lead single from her second studio album Color Theory.

Background
The song touches upon themes of depression and its effects on everyday mental health. The song's music video, directed by Atiba Jefferson, pictures Allison meeting with skateboarders in Palm Springs, California. To promote the song, Soccer Mommy performed the song, as well as "Lucy", on Jimmy Kimmel Live! on February 26, 2020.

Reception 
Spin columnist Will Gottsegen dubbed the track a "compelling contradiction", contrasting its upbeat sound with its despondent lyrics: "It's that air of mismatch that makes "circle the drain" one of Soccer Mommy's most compelling songs to date." James Rettig at Stereogum compared it to the music of Avril Lavigne, while Pitchfork reviewer Jayson Greene likened it to Sheryl Crow and 2000s pop production team the Matrix.

References

2020 singles
2020 songs
Loma Vista Recordings singles
Soccer Mommy songs